Heng On may refer to:
 Heng On (constituency), a constituency of the Sha Tin District Council
 Heng On Estate, a public housing estate in Ma On Shan, Hong Kong
 Heng On station, an MTR rapid transit station adjacent to the estate